Cuyamecalco Mixtec is a Mixtec language of Oaxaca spoken in Cuyamecalco, San Miguel Santa Flor, and Santa Ana Cuauhtémoc. Egland & Bartholomew had found Cuauhtémoc to be more intelligible with Coatzospan Mixtec, which in any case is close to Cuyamecalco.

References 

Mixtec language